Triafulvalene or cyclopropenylidenecyclopropene is a fulvalene hydrocarbon with chemical formula C6H4, composed of two linked cyclopropene rings. Triafulvalene has never been isolated, since it can decompose via an isodesmic reaction. However, this molecule is of theoretical significance for theoretical organic chemists, and its structure, stability, and spectral properties are well-studied.

See also 
 Calicene
 Fulvalene
 Sesquifulvalene

References

Fulvalenes
Hypothetical chemical compounds
Cyclopropenes